is a Japanese former singer, actor, and idol whose career lasted from 1991 to 2000. He was a member of Johnny's Junior until 15 October 2000.

Filmography

Music program

Variety program

Television drama

Film

See also
Johnny & Associates

References

External links
Kohara Club
 Yuki Kohara

Johnny & Associates
Japanese male actors
1980 births
Living people
Musicians from Okayama Prefecture
21st-century Japanese singers
21st-century Japanese male singers